Melita Lorković (25 November 1907 – 1 November 1987), was a Croatian female pianist and music pedagogue.

Family 
She was born in Županja. Brother Mladen Pozajić was also a pianist, composer, music pedagogue, conductor and publicist. Melita educated through private lessons by Svetislav Stančić, Alfred Cortot, Lazare Lévy, Yvonne Lefebure, Wanda Landowska and Eduard Steuermann. She was introduced to her future husband Radoslav Lorković, an engineer, thanks to her friend, also a pianist, Vlasta Lorković. She had two sons: Hrvoje, who was a physiologist, professor in Tübingen, London, Minneapolis and Ulm, and Radovan, a professor.

Work 
After her concert tours in Scandinavia, Germany, Austria, Italy, as well as out of Europe, she was compared with the greatest pianists of that time Emil von Sauer, Myra Hess, Teresa Carreño and Dinu Lipatti. She was a university professor at the Music Academy in Zagreb (1929-1945), at the Music Academy in Belgrade (1948-1960), and in Cairo (1960-1972).. Her students were Milko Kelemen and Milan Horvat. She was appreciated of her interpretations of Beethoven's sonatas, Schumann's Carnival and Kreislariane, Brahms, Chopin's miniatures, Listz's Sonata in h-minor, Tschaikovsky, Debussy, Rahmaninov and Bartok as well as sonatas of Boris Papandopulo, Kunc's Nokturno, Moussorgsky's Images, Dora Pejačević's opus et al.

References 

1907 births
1987 deaths
People from Županja
Croatian pianists
Academy of Music, University of Zagreb alumni
Women classical pianists